Mount Chittenden, elevation , is a mountain peak in the Absaroka Range in Yellowstone National Park. The peak was named by Henry Gannett of the Hayden Geological Survey of 1878 for George B. Chittenden, a surveyor who had worked with Gannett, Hayden and others in surveys in Montana, Idaho and Wyoming. Chittenden never participated in any of the Yellowstone surveys.

Mount Chittenden was not named for Major Hiram M. Chittenden, the U.S. Army Engineer famous for his road and bridge work in the park.

See also
 Mountains and mountain ranges of Yellowstone National Park

Notes

Mountains of Wyoming
Mountains of Yellowstone National Park
Mountains of Park County, Wyoming